Glen Echo is an unincorporated community in Larimer County, Colorado, United States. The community borders Rustic to the east.

References

Unincorporated communities in Larimer County, Colorado
Unincorporated communities in Colorado